The 2022 Mid-Season Invitational was the seventh Mid-Season Invitational (MSI), a Riot Gamesorganised tournament for League of Legends, a multiplayer online battle arena video game. The tournament was the culmination of the 2022 Spring Split and the first interregional competition of Season 12.

11 of the 12 premier League of Legends leagues had a team representing them; the LCL was not participating due to the Spring Split being cancelled as a result of the 2022 Russian invasion of Ukraine. The competition continued the same format that was introduced during MSI 2021. The minimum prize pool was 250,000.

"Set It Off" was the tournament's theme song, put together by DPR Live, and DPR Cline.

The tournament was hosted in Busan, South Korea, from 10 to 29 May 2022. The Group Stage was held in the Busan Esports Arena, while the Rumble Stage and Knockout Stage was  held in the Busan Exhibition and Convention Center (BEXCO) Exhibition Hall 1 in Busan. Due to COVID-19 pandemic in mainland China, the qualified team from LPL competed remotely from China, in the team's training facility.

Defending champion Royal Never Give Up from China defeated T1 from South Korea 3–2 in the final, winning their third MSI title.

Format 
Teams from 11 regions competed in the Group Stage, the Rumble Stage, and the Knockout Stage, similar to the format used in the 2021 Mid-Season Invitational.

Group stage 
All teams were drawn into three groups, with two of the groups having four teams and one group with three teams. All matches was a best-of-one double round robin.

Rumble Stage 
The top two teams from each group competed in the Rumble Stage. The matches was a best-of-one double round robin.

Knockout stage 
The top four teams advanced to the Knockout Stage. The matches was a best-of-one single elimination.

Qualified teams 
Due to the ongoing Russian invasion of Ukraine, the LCL Spring Split had been cancelled, and the CIS region therefore could not participate in the tournament.

Roster 
 Player didn't play any games.

Venue 
Busan was the city chosen to host the competition. Group Stage was held at the Busan Esports Arena, while the Rumble Stage and Knockout Stage was held at the BEXCO.

Group stage 
 Date and time: 10–15 May, began at 17:00 KST (08:00 UTC)
 Eleven teams were drawn into three groups, two groups of four and one group of three
 Double round robin for Groups A and B, quadruple round robin for Group C; all matches were best-of-one
 If two teams had the same win–loss record and head-to-head record, then a tiebreaker match would have been played
 Top two teams advanced to the Rumble Stage; bottom two teams were eliminated

Group A

Group B

Group C

Rumble stage 

 Date and time: 20–24 May, begins at 15:00 KST (06:00 UTC)
 Six teams played in a double round robin; matches were best-of-one
 If teams had the same win–loss record and head-to-head record, then tiebreaker matches would have been played for first, second, and fourth place
 Top four teams advanced to the Knockout Stage; bottom two teams were eliminated

Knockout stage 

 Date and time: 27–29 May, 17:00 KST (08:00 UTC)
 Single elimination, matches are best-of-five
 Top team from the Rumble Stage chose between 3rd and 4th to be their opponent and the day of play for the semifinals (RNG chose EG).

Semifinals

Match 1 

 Date: 27 May

Match 2 

 Date: 28 May

Finals 

 Date: 29 May
 The members of the winning team will lift the MSI trophy, earning their title as the League of Legends 2022 Mid-Season Invitational Champions.

Ranking 
(*) Not including tie-break games.

Prize pool 
The prize pool consists of a 250,000 prize guaranteed by Riot and "a percentage of revenue share for the sale of certain designated digital goods associated with MSI". The prize pool is distributed unevenly among all the teams.

Notes

References 

Mid-Season Invitational, 2022
Mid-Season Invitational, 2022
2022